The 1993 Hopman Cup was the fifth edition of the Hopman Cup that was held at the Burswood Entertainment Complex, in Perth, Western Australia. Steffi Graf and Michael Stich of Germany defeated Arantxa Sánchez Vicario and Emilio Sánchez of Spain in the final to win the title. The tournament took place between 2 January through 8 January 1993.

Teams

Seeds 
  – Steffi Graf and Michael Stich (champions)
  – Jana Novotná and Petr Korda (semifinals)
  - Arantxa Sánchez Vicario and Emilio Sánchez (final)
  – Mary Joe Fernández and MaliVai Washington (quarterfinals)
  - Nathalie Tauziat and Guy Forget (semifinals)
  - Amanda Coetzer and Wayne Ferreira (first round)
  - Judith Wiesner and Thomas Muster (first round)
  - Manuela Maleeva-Fragniere and Claudio Mezzadri (quarterfinals)

Unseeded 
  – Nicole Provis and Wally Masur (quarterfinals)
  – Kimiko Date and Yasufumi Yamamoto (first round)
  – Anna Smashnova and Amos Mansdorf (first round)
  – Natalia Medvedeva and Andrei Medvedev (quarterfinals)

Draw

First round

Austria vs. Ukraine

France vs. Israel

Japan vs. Switzerland

Australia vs. South Africa

Quarterfinals

Germany vs. Ukraine

USA vs. France

Switzerland vs. Spain

Australia vs. Czech Republic

Semifinals

Germany vs. France

Spain vs. Czech Republic

Final

Germany vs. Spain

External links
 1993 Hopman Cup Draw and Results itftennis.com

Hopman Cups by year
Hopman Cup